James Last (born Hans Last; 17 April 1929 – 9 June 2015), also known as Hansi, was a German composer and big band leader of the James Last Orchestra. Initially a jazz bassist (Last won the award for "best bassist" in Germany in each of the years 1950–1952), his trademark "happy music" made his numerous albums best-sellers in Germany and the United Kingdom, with 65 of his albums reaching the charts in the UK alone.  His composition "Happy Heart" became an international success in interpretations by Andy Williams and Petula Clark.

Last is reported to have sold an estimated 200 million records worldwide in his lifetime (figures vary widely, for example British Hit Singles & Albums (2006) reports 100 million at that time), of which 80 million were sold by 1973 - and won numerous awards including 200 gold and 14 platinum discs in Germany, the International MIDEM Prize at MIDEM in 1969, and West Germany's highest civilian award, the Bundesverdienstkreuz (Order of Merit of the Federal Republic of Germany) in 1978. His album This Is James Last remained a UK best-seller for 48 weeks, and his song "Games That Lovers Play" has been covered over a hundred times. Last undertook his final tour months before his death at age 86, upon discovering in September 2014 that an illness (the exact illness was never disclosed) had worsened. His final UK performance was his 90th at London's Royal Albert Hall, more than any other performer except Eric Clapton.

Last's trademark sound employed big band arrangements of well-known tunes with a jaunty dance beat, often heavy on bass and brass. Despite at times being derided by critics and purists as the "king of elevator music" or "acoustic porridge", his style and music were popular in numerous countries and cultures, including Japan, South Korea, the former Soviet Union, the US and UK, and his native Germany, where it became "the archetypal soundtrack of any German cellar bar party", and made him the "most commercially successful bandleader" of the second half of the 20th century. Last's composition Jägerlatein is known in Ireland as the theme tune to The Sunday Game, a live sporting show which follows GAA hurling and Gaelic football All Ireland Championships since 1979.

Early life
Last was born to Louis and Martha Last in Bremen, Germany. He was the younger brother of Robert Last and Werner Last (aka Kai Warner). His father was an official at the postal and public works department of the city of Bremen and Last grew up in the suburb of Sebaldsbrück. He began studying the piano at age 10, although he could play simple tunes such as the folk song "Hänschen klein" when he was 9. His first music teacher felt he lacked any musical talent. Last started playing more actively with his second tutor and switched to the double bass as a teenager. His home city of Bremen was bombed heavily during World War II, and he ran messages to air defence command posts during the raids. He entered the Bückeburg Military Music School of the German Wehrmacht at the age of 14 and learned to play bass, piano and tuba.

After the end of the war, he joined Hans Günther Oesterreich's Radio Bremen Dance Orchestra. In 1948 he became the leader of the Last-Becker Ensemble, which performed for seven years. He was voted as the best bassist in the country in a German jazz poll for 1950, 1951 and 1952. When the Last-Becker Ensemble disbanded, he became the in-house arranger for Polydor Records, as well as a number of European radio stations. During the next decade he helped arrange hits for artists such as Helmut Zacharias, Freddy Quinn, Lolita, Alfred Hause and Caterina Valente.

Work

Last first released albums in the U.S. under the titles The American Patrol on Warner Bros. Records around 1964. He also released a series of nine albums in a series called Classics Up To Date which served up arrangements of classical melodies with strings, rhythm and wordless chorus from the mid-1960s until the early 1980s. Last's 1965 album, Non Stop Dancing, was a recording of brief renditions of popular songs, all tied together by an insistent dance beat and crowd noises. It was a hit and helped make him a major European star. Over the next four decades, Last released over 190 records, including several more volumes of Non Stop Dancing. On these records, he varied his formula by adding different songs from different countries and genres, as well as guest performers like Richard Clayderman and Astrud Gilberto.

He also had his own successful television series throughout the 1970s with guests including ABBA and Lynsey de Paul which was screened across Europe. Last's trademark sound employed big band arrangements of well-known tunes with a jaunty dance beat, often heavy on bass and brass.

Though his concerts and albums were consistently successful, especially in the UK, where he had 52 hit albums between 1967 and 1986, which made him second only to Elvis Presley in charting records, he had relatively few hit singles. In the UK, his only chart singles were "The Seduction", a cover version of the theme from American Gigolo (1980) composed by Giorgio Moroder, and "Biscaya" from the album Biscaya. His single "Mornings at Seven" became a familiar tune in Britain after the BBC used it as the theme music for an ice skating program. It was released on 7" vinyl in 1968 and has been included on By Request and Eighty Not Out.

In the US, where "The Seduction" became a Top 40 hit, peaking at No. 28 on the Billboard Hot 100 and No. 22 on the Adult Contemporary chart in May 1980. Last was somewhat more successful on the singles charts. In 2003, his song "Einsamer Hirte" (The Lonely Shepherd) which features the pan flute of Gheorghe Zamfir appeared on the soundtrack of the Quentin Tarantino movie Kill Bill Volume 1.

He won numerous popular and professional awards, including Billboard magazine's Star of the Year trophy in 1976, and was honoured for lifetime achievement with the German ECHO prize in 1994. His song "Music from Across the Way" (recorded by Andy Williams in 1972) is a melody with a classical feeling and was a worldwide hit; it was the only other Last single apart from "The Seduction" to reach the U.S. Hot 100, where it peaked at No. 84 (and No. 18 on the Adult Contemporary chart) in late 1971. (His only other U.S. chart single was a double-sided entry featuring remakes of the Village Stompers' "Washington Square" and Creedence Clearwater Revival's "Proud Mary", which reached No. 22 on the Adult Contemporary chart in early 1971).

Last was awarded the Carl Alan Award by Princess Margaret for being the leader of the most popular dance band of 1981. In Canada, he had three hits on the RPM Top Singles charts ("El Cóndor Pasa" at No. 46, "Music from Across the Way" at No. 28, "The Seduction" at No. 32) and four on the Adult Contemporary/MOR charts ("Music from..." at No. 2, "Heart of Gold" at No. 17, "The Seduction" at No. 36, "Reach for a Star" at No. 20).

Songs composed by Last which achieved success in the US include "Happy Heart" and "Music from Across the Way", both recorded by Andy Williams, "Games That Lovers Play", recorded by Eddie Fisher, and "Fool", recorded by Elvis Presley. By the time of his farewell tour in the spring of 2015, Last was reported to have sold well over 100 million albums.

His signature piece was "Orange Blossom Special". He played this at almost every concert. He encouraged the band to have fun with it and sometimes the band members would go into the audience and make a conga line  with duck head umbrellas. It was always a popular piece at his concerts.

In February 2015, after almost 50 years on tour, James Last announced that he was finally bidding adieu to the stage. The last concert of his Non Stop Music James Last in Concert 2015 farewell tour took place in Lanxess Arena in Cologne on 26 April 2015.

Personal life
Last married his first wife, Waltraud, in 1955; they had two children, Ronald and Caterina. After 42 years of marriage, Waltraud died in 1997. Two years later, Last married Christine Grundner from Bavaria. Last and Christine divided their time between homes in Florida and Hamburg. He gave much credit to Christine and son Ronald for help with his music.

Financial difficulties 
Despite being the "most commercially successful bandleader" of the second half of the 20th century, Last's extravagant spending and "incompetent" financial advice led him at one stage to the "brink of ruin." James Last did not make as big a fortune as his immense record sales would suggest. He fell victim to a number of investment fraudsters, starting with his tax advisor. He bought oil rigs, wineries and cotton fields in the US as depreciation assets. When he wanted to visit his wineries in 1985, it turned out that none of the projects existed. As a result, the tax breaks ceased and there were large additional claims. Last was barely prevented from selling his publishing rights. He took out a loan from the Hamburger Sparkasse and was not financially debt-free again until shortly before his 70th birthday.

Illness, final tour and death 
In September 2014 Last learned that a "life threatening" illness had worsened (the exact details were never disclosed), and in early 2015 he announced his retirement from touring would take place following a final "goodbye tour", which commenced in Germany and ended in London. Last died less than three months later, on 9 June 2015 in Florida at the age of 86.

Writing in The Independent, Spencer Leigh suggested that Last's Non-Stop Dancing albums "paved the way for disco and dance mixes". Asked if he minded being labelled the "King of Corn", Last reportedly replied "No, because it is true."

Awards 
List of awards:

 MIDEM-Trophy, Cannes for 1 million non Stop Dancing records.
 Deutscher Schallplattenpreis from Fono Forum for the new arrangement of Bertholt Brecht's Dreigroschenoper.
 Europa - Europawelle Saar.
 Goldenes Grammophon, Munich.
 Silber Möwe, Hamburg.
 Gold Leaf Award (Canada) for Super Non Stop Dancing.
 Gold Leaf Award (Canada) for James Dos His Thing.
 Gold Award, Record World Top German Orchestra.
 Country Musik Award, (ASCAO) for When The Snow Is On The Rose.
 ASCAP Award for Elvis Presley recording of Fool.
 Goldene Westfalenhalle.
 Goldener Notenschlüssel from the German Music Publisher Sikorski.
 Ehrenlöwe from Radio Luxembourg.
 Star Of The Year Trophy from Music Week and Billboard, London.
 Robert Stolz-Preis from the Robert-Stolz-Stiftung.
 Bundesverdienstkreuz am Bande from the German President Walter Scheel.
 Die Goldene Kamera - Hörzu.
 Award from Cashbox for The Seduction for the best instrumental production of the year.
 Special-Prize for 52 Chart-Albums, Great Britain.
 Goldene Stimmgabel from ZDF 1991.
 Goldene Eins 1994.
 Echo 1994 Life Award 1995.
 Goldene Europa 1998.

Discography
Productions of James Last: (As Hans Last, Orlando and James Last)

Studio albums

Live albums
 Freddy Live (1968) (live concert with Freddy Quinn)
 Live in Copenhagen (1970) (bootleg based on radio broadcast, not official release)
 James Last Live (1974) (2 LP-album)
 Live in Hannover (1976) (bootleg based on radio broadcast, not official release)
 Live in London (1978) (2 LP-album)
 Live in London (1979) (bootleg based on radio broadcast, not official release)
 Live in Tokyo (1979) (bootleg based on radio broadcast, not official release)
 The Berlin-Concert ’87 (1987)
 Live at the Royal Albert Hall (1990) (bootleg based on radio broadcast, not official release)
 The Best of Live on Tour (1998)
 Concerts (1999)
 Gentleman of Music (2000)
 A World of Music (2002)
 Live in Europe (2006)
 Live at the Royal Albert Hall (released as 1 DVD-edition and 2 CD-edition) (2008)
 Music is My World (2011) (first three tracks only; the rest is a compilation of old studio recordings)

Soundtracks
 Morning's at Seven (1968)
 When Sweet Moonlight Is Sleeping in the Hills (1969)
 The Captain (1971)
 Schwarzwaldfahrt aus Liebeskummer (1974)
 Grenzenloses Himmelblau (1985)
 Traumschiff-Melodien (1986)
  (1988)
 Why Men Don't Listen and Women Can't Read Maps (2007)

Singles (selection)
 Tricks in Rhythm (1959) (EP, single)
 "Midnight in December" (1966) (single)
 The Lonely Shepherd with Gheorghe Zamfir (1977) (single) (used in a number of films)

Compilation albums (selection)
 Fanfare (1967)
 Does His Thing (Happy Music) (1970)
 El Condor Pasa (1971)
 In Concert 2 (1971)
 Super Non-Stop Dancing (1972)
 Stereo Spectacular (1973)
 Il Y A Toujours Du Soleil (Golden Hearts) (James Last & Richard Clayderman) (1990)
 Country Cousins (1992)
 Best of Kapt'n James (1998)
 Classics Up to Date 8 (1998)
 Sólo Éxitos (Polydor 543 686-2 Venezuela 2001)
 In Los Angeles (Well Kept Secret 1975) (2008)
 Eighty Not Out (released as a 3-CD edition) (2010)
 Gold Top 100 (Brunswick 5CD 533 240-1 DE 2011)
 The Complete Collection (Universal 8CD 533 347-4 IT 2011)
 Glanzlichter (Koch Universal 277 198-4 DE 2011)
 Classic Christmas (Spectrum Music SPEC 2083 UK 2011)
 Christmas With Romance (Universal 533 619-2 IT 2011)
 Voodoo-Party / Well Kept Secret (Vocalion 2on1 CDSML 8477 UK 2011)
 My Personal Favourites (Polydor 2CD 470 979-9 DE 2014)
 Happy Summer Night / Rock Me Gently (Vocalion 2on1 CDLK 4539 UK 2014)
 World Hits / Hair (Vocalion 2CD CDSML 8507 UK 2014)
 Beachparty (Polydor 4CD 472 433-2 DE 2015)
 Dancing à gogo (Polydor 4CD 472 544-1 DE 2015)
 Silver Collection (RISA / Force10Music / Universal BUDCD 1400 (435 399–0) ZA 2015)
 Ich find' Schlager toll (Polydor 536 934 4 DE 2016)

Chart positions

Albums

Singles

See also
James Last Orchestra

References

External links

"Relentlessly happy - James Last at 85". Deutsche welle, 2014-04-16

 
1929 births
2015 deaths
20th-century German musicians
Easy listening musicians
German bandleaders
German composers
German conductors (music)
German male conductors (music)
German expatriates in the United States
German jazz bandleaders
German jazz composers
German jazz double-bassists
Male double-bassists
German songwriters
Jazz arrangers
Male jazz composers
Musicians from Bremen
Polydor Records artists
Recipients of the Cross of the Order of Merit of the Federal Republic of Germany
Warner Records artists
James Last Orchestra members
Last-Becker Ensemble members
Burials at the Ohlsdorf Cemetery